The Azra Naheed Medical College (abbreviated as ANMC), established in 2011 and named after Azra Naheed, is a private college of medicine, pharmacy and allied health professions. It is located in Lahore, Punjab, Pakistan.

The Superior college,(DAI) and accredited by the Pakistan Medical Commission (PMC) for MBBS degree. It is a constituent college of the Superior University. Social Security Hospital, Manga, Raiwind and Ch. M. Akram Hospital are teaching hospitals of the college for training.

See also
 Superior University

External links
 

Medical colleges in Punjab, Pakistan
2011 establishments in Pakistan